Meryey was a king of ancient Libya (or the Libu), during the late 13th century BC.  He was the son of Ded.  His reign was contemporary with pharaoh Merneptah of Egypt (1213-1203 BC).  He is mentioned as the architect of a major military alliance amongst his nation, the Meshwesh, Lukka, and the Sea Peoples known as the Ekwesh, Teresh, Shekelesh, and the Sherden. This confederacy went to war against Merneptah in the western delta during the 5th and 6th years of his reign.

The "Great chief Meryey" had 6 sons, all of whom were slain at Perire. 
He led a confederacy or an army of 40,000 men to war against Merneptah and, though successful at the beginning, was eventually defeated at Prosopis.

Literary sources

The Great Karnak Inscription describes the scene when Merneptah receives news of the attack:

"... the third season, saying: 'The wretched, fallen chief of Libya, Meryey, son of Ded, has fallen upon the country of Tehenu with his bowmen — Sherden, Shekelesh, Ekwesh, Lukka, Teresh. Taking the best of every warrior and every man of war of his country. He has brought his wife and his children — leaders of the camp, and he has reached the western boundary in the fields of Perire.

"His majesty was enraged at their report, like a lion," assembled his court and gave a rousing speech. Later, he dreamed he saw Ptah handing him a sword and saying, "Take thou (it) and banish thou the fearful heart from thee." When the bowmen went forth, says the inscription, "Amun was with them as a shield." After six hours, the surviving Nine Bows threw down their weapons, abandoned their baggage and dependents, and ran for their lives. Merneptah states that he defeated the invasion, killing 6,000 soldiers and taking 9,000 prisoners.

The inscription describes in full detail Meryey's feverish emotional collapse upon the field of battle upon realizing defeat was imminent.

References

Ancient Libyan rulers
Ancient peoples
Egyptian inscriptions
Sea Peoples
13th-century BC rulers